Makar Litskevich (born 3 March 2002) is a Belarusian professional footballer who plays for Shakhtyor Petrikov on loan from Shakhtyor Soligorsk.

Honours
Shakhtyor Soligorsk
Belarusian Premier League champion: 2020, 2021

References

External links 
 
 

2002 births
Living people
People from Baranavichy
Sportspeople from Brest Region
Belarusian footballers
Association football midfielders
FC Shakhtyor Soligorsk players
FC Sputnik Rechitsa players
FC Shakhtyor Petrikov players